The 1998 FIBA Africa Under-18 Championship was the 11th FIBA Africa Under-18 Championship, played under the rules of FIBA, the world governing body for basketball, and the FIBA Africa thereof. The tournament was hosted by Egypt from August 27 to September 3, 1998.

Nigeria ended the round-robin tournament with a 5–0 unbeaten record to win their fourth title.

Both winner and runner-up qualified for the 1999 FIBA Under-19 World Championship.

Participating teams

Squads

Schedule

Final standings

Awards

See also
 1999 FIBA Africa Championship

External links
Official Website

References

1998 in African basketball
1998 in Egyptian sport
FIBA Africa Under-18 Championship